Ryan Wright may refer to:
 Ryan Wright (rugby league)
 Ryan Wright (American football)